Alfred Peal was a farmer and state legislator in Mississippi. He was born in Mississippi and was enslaved. He served in the Mississippi House of Representatives from Marshall County, Mississippi in 1874 and 1875.

He was among the Republican leaders who pledged support for the renomination of congressman A. R. Howe.

See also
 African-American officeholders during and following the Reconstruction era

References

African-American state legislators in Mississippi
Republican Party members of the Mississippi House of Representatives
African-American politicians during the Reconstruction Era
Farmers from Mississippi
African-American farmers
People from Marshall County, Mississippi
American freedmen